The Creative Teddy Wilson (also released as For Quiet Lovers) is a studio album by American jazz pianist Teddy Wilson featuring performances recorded in 1955 for the Norgran label.

Reception
Allmusic awarded the album 3 stars.

Track listing
 "Blues for the Oldest Profession" (Teddy Wilson) - 2:59
 "It Had to Be You" (Isham Jones, Gus Kahn) - 3:09
 "You Took Advantage of Me" (Richard Rodgers, Lorenz Hart) - 4:17
 "Three Little Words" (Harry Ruby, Bert Kalmar) - 2:42
 "If I Had You" (Jimmy Campbell, Reg Connelly, Ted Shapiro) - 2:34
 "Who's Sorry Now?" (Ted Snyder, Ruby, Kalmar) - 3:38
 "The Birth of the Blues" (Buddy DeSylva, Lew Brown, Ray Henderson) - 2:53
 "When Your Lover Has Gone" (Einar Aaron Swan) - 2:50
 "Moonlight on the Ganges" (Sherman Myers, Chester Wallace) - 3:50
 "April in Paris" (Vernon Duke, Yip Harburg) - 3:27
 "Hallelujah" (Vincent Youmans, Leo Robin, Clifford Grey) - 3:11
 "Get Out of Town" (Cole Porter) - 3:28

Personnel
Teddy Wilson - piano 
Milt Hinton – bass
Jo Jones - drums

References

Verve Records albums
Norgran Records albums
Teddy Wilson albums
1955 albums
Albums produced by Norman Granz